Flávio Henrique de Paiva Campos (born August 29, 1965) is a former Brazilian football player and manager.

Club statistics

References

External links

1965 births
Living people
Footballers from Rio de Janeiro (city)
Brazilian footballers
Brazilian expatriate footballers
Expatriate footballers in Japan
Brazilian football managers
Campeonato Brasileiro Série A players
Campeonato Brasileiro Série B players
J1 League players
CR Flamengo footballers
São Paulo FC players
Guarani FC players
CR Vasco da Gama players
Gamba Osaka players
Clube Atlético Bragantino players
Kyoto Sanga FC players
Esporte Clube Juventude players
América Futebol Clube (SP) players
Clube 15 de Novembro managers
Esporte Clube Juventude managers
Canoas Sport Club managers
Clube do Remo managers
Grêmio Esportivo Brasil managers
Sampaio Corrêa Futebol Clube managers
Clube Esportivo Lajeadense managers
Clube Esportivo Bento Gonçalves managers
Association football midfielders